The spotted ctenotus (Ctenotus uber)  is a species of skink found in Western Australia.

References

uber
Reptiles described in 1969
Taxa named by Glen Milton Storr